The Kuznetsov-class aircraft carrying cruiser (Russian: Авиано́сцы ти́па «Кузнецо́в» Avianо́stsii Tipa "Kuznetsо́v"), Soviet designation Project 1143.5, is a class of aircraft carriers operated by the Russian and Chinese navies. Originally designed for the Soviet Navy, the Kuznetsov-class ships use a ski-jump to launch high-performance conventional aircraft in a STOBAR configuration. The design represented a major advance in Soviet fleet aviation over the  carriers, which could only launch VSTOL aircraft. The Soviet Union's classification for the class was as a heavy aircraft-carrying cruiser, which permits the ships to transit the Turkish Straits without violating the Montreux Convention. However, the Chinese variants are classified as aircraft carriers.

Because of the dissolution of the Soviet Union in 1991, the three Kuznetsov-class ships were built over a protracted construction period of almost four decades. Two ships were originally laid down at the Nikolayev South Shipyard in the Ukrainian SSR, to be followed by the first of the Ulyanovsk-class nuclear-powered supercarriers. Only the lead ship  had been commissioned when the Soviet Union dissolved in 1991, and the ship now serves in the Russian Navy. Construction of her sister ship Varyag was abandoned until 1998, when an independent Ukraine sold the uncompleted ship to China for use as a floating casino, along with a complete set of blueprints. Varyag was eventually completed and commissioned in 2012 as China's first aircraft carrier, the Type 001 aircraft carrier . China subsequently constructed a third ship to a modified Type 002 design, commissioning  in 2019.

Role
The Kuznetsov-class ships were described by their Soviet builders as Tyazholiy Avianesushchiy Kreyser (TAKR or TAVKR) – "heavy aircraft-carrying cruiser” – intended to support and defend strategic missile-carrying submarines, surface ships, and maritime missile-carrying aircraft of the Soviet fleet. In its fleet defense role, Admiral Kuznetsovs P-700 Granit (SS-N-19 NATO reporting name: Shipwreck) anti-ship cruise missiles, 3K95 Kinzhal (Gauntlet) surface-to-air missiles, and Su-33 (Flanker-D) aircraft are its main weapons. The fixed-wing aircraft on Kuznetsov are intended for air superiority operations to protect a deployed task force. The carrier also carries numerous helicopters for anti-submarine warfare (ASW) and search and rescue (SAR) operations.

Transiting the Turkish Straits

The Russian naval system classifies its Kuznetsov-class ship as a heavy aircraft-carrying cruiser because it was fitted with long-range anti-ship cruise missiles. Under the 1936 Montreux Convention, aircraft carriers heavier than 15,000 tons may not pass through the Turkish Straits. Since Kuznetsov exceeds the displacement limit, it would have been confined to the Black Sea if it had been classified as an aircraft carrier. However, there is no tonnage restriction on other capital ships operated by Black Sea Powers. Turkey has allowed  to pass through the Straits, and no other signatory to the Montreux Convention has objected to its designation as an aircraft cruiser.

The Chinese Navy regards its Type 001 ships as aircraft carriers.
The Chinese aircraft carrier Liaoning is armed with air-defense weapons, but it is not equipped with the anti-ship or anti-submarine missiles that are on Admiral Kuznetsov. Instead, the hangar bay was extended to carry more aircraft.

History 
In October 1978 the Soviet government decided to continue the production of additional Project 1143 (Kiev-class) aircraft carriers, with the fifth vessel built with improved features like catapults and arresting gear. This resulted in the Project 1143.5 plan created by the Nevskoye Bureau and approved at the end of 1979. As originally planned, Project 1143.5 was to have a full load displacement of 65,000 tons, CATOBAR capability, and an air wing based around fixed-wing aircraft and Kamov helicopters. However, by 1980 Soviet defense minister Dmitry Ustinov ordered the deletion of the catapults, reduction of the ship's displacement by 10,000 tons, and revision of the air component toward VSTOL aircraft. The design was revised to support only VSTOL aircraft under the project name "Nitka", but then was revised again to its final configuration to provide for fixed-wing aircraft by adding a 12-degree ski-jump.

Design

Hull and flight deck
The hull design is derived from the 1982 , but is larger in both length and beam. The Kiev-class ships had only an angled flight deck, with surface weaponry on the foredeck. The Kuznetsov-class is the first Soviet carrier to be designed with a full-length flight deck. The ship's 12 anti-ship cruise missiles are located in launchers below the flight deck, just aft of the ski-jump.

The aircraft carriers are of a STOBAR configuration: Short Take-Off But Arrested Recovery. Short take-off is achieved by using a 12-degree ski-jump on the bow. There is also an angled deck with arresting wires, which allows aircraft to land without interfering with launching aircraft. Two aircraft elevators, on the starboard side forward and aft of the island, move aircraft between the hangar deck and the flight deck.

Air wing
In the original project specifications, the ship should be able to carry up to 33 fixed-wing aircraft and 12 helicopters . The primary aircraft carried are Sukhoi Su-33 fighters, naval variants of the Sukhoi Su-27 Flanker. Kamov Ka-27 naval utility helicopters and its subsequent variants make up the helicopter wing, providing anti-submarine, maritime patrol and naval assault mobility capabilities. In addition, the Kamov Ka-52K "Katran" attack helicopter, a naval variant of the Kamov Ka-50, can also be included in its air wing.

Armament

The Kuznetsov-class ships were originally designed as aircraft cruisers. Kuznetsov carries twelve launchers for P-700 Granit (SS-N-19 Shipwreck) anti-ship surface-to-surface missiles, which also form the main armament of the s. The Granits would be stored in 12 vertical launchers located beneath the ship's front deck, just before the inclined ski-jump. The top deck hatches of these launchers would open to allow the missiles to be fired, however, when open they prevented the simultaneous launch of aircraft. The heavy surface armament makes Kuznetsov different from other countries' aircraft carriers, which carry only defensive armament and rely on their aircraft for strike power.

For long-range air defense, Kuznetsov carries 24 vertical launchers for Tor missile system (SA-N-9 Gauntlet) surface-to-air missiles with 192 missiles. For close-range air defense, the ship carries eight Kashtan close-in weapon system (CIWS) mounts. Each mount has two launchers for 9M311 SAMs, twin GSh-30 30 mm rotary cannons, and a radar/optronic director. The ship also carries six AK-630 30 mm rotary cannons in single mounts. For defense against underwater attack, the ship carries the UDAV-1 ASW rocket launcher.

The Russian Navy reportedly removed the Granit missile tubes in the late 2000s to make room for a larger hangar bay, but it was never clear that the tubes were ever actually removed. During a major overhaul set to begin in September 2017, the P-700 tubes will be replaced with new vertical launch tubes capable of housing newer Kalibr and P-800 Oniks cruise missiles. Air defense upgrades will include replacement of the Kashtan CIWS with the Pantsir-M and the 3K95 Kinzhal/Tor system with the Poliment-Redut system.

Electronics

Admiral Kuznetsov has D/E band air and surface target acquisition radar (passive electronically scanned array), F band surface search radar, G/H band flight control radar, I band navigation radar, and four K band fire-control radars for the Kashtan CIWS.

The ship has hull-mounted medium- and low-frequency search and attack sonar. The ASW helicopters have surface search radar, dipping sonar, sonobuoys, and magnetic anomaly detectors.

Propulsion and performance
Admiral Kuznetsov is conventionally powered by eight gas-fired boilers and four steam turbines, each producing , driving four shafts with fixed-pitch propellers.

Reliability

Admiral Kuznetsov has been plagued by years of technical problems. The vessel's steam turbines and turbo-pressurised boilers have been reported to be so unreliable that the carrier is accompanied by a large ocean-going tug whenever it deploys, in case it breaks down. There are also flaws in the water piping system, which causes it to freeze during winter. To prevent pipes from bursting, the water is turned off in most of the cabins, and half the latrines do not work.

Type 001 design changes

The Chinese Type 001 ships are configured as aircraft carriers. The cruise missile launchers were never installed, and the launcher base was removed during the refit to incorporate a larger hangar bay. The air-defense system consists of FL-3000N surface-to-air-missiles and the Type 1130 CIWS.

Type 002 design changes

Several design changes were made to the Type 002 aircraft carrier. Length, width, and displacement have been slightly increased. The island of the ship has been reduced in size to increase the size of the flight deck, and it carries a 3-D phased array radar. The ship claims can carry 36 aircraft instead of the 24 J-15 fighters carried by CNS Liaoning.

Ships

Admiral Kuznetsov

Admiral Flota Sovetskogo Soyuza Kuznetsov was designed by the Neva Design Bureau, St. Petersburg, and built at the Nikolayev South Shipyard (Chernomorskoye Shipyard) in the Ukrainian SSR. She was launched in 1985, commissioned in 1990, and became fully operational in 1995. The vessel was named Riga, Leonid Brezhnev, and Tbilisi, before finally being named after Soviet admiral Nikolay Kuznetsov.

During the winter of 1995–1996, Admiral Kuznetsov deployed to the Mediterranean Sea to mark the 300th anniversary of the Russian Navy. In late 2000, Admiral Kuznetsov went to sea for recovery and salvage operations for the submarine . In late 2007 and early 2008, Admiral Kuznetsov again deployed to the Mediterranean. Most recently, Admiral Kuznetsov was deployed to the Mediterranean in late 2016 and early 2017 to support Russian operations in Syria.

Although technical and financial problems have limited operations, Admiral Kuznetsov is expected to remain in service until approximately 2025.

Liaoning

The second member of the Kuznetsov class took a much more roundabout route to active service. Known first as Riga and then Varyag, she was laid down by the Nikolayev South Shipyard in 1985 and launched in 1988. Varyag had not yet been commissioned when the Soviet Union dissolved in 1991, and the ship was left to deteriorate in the elements. In 1998, the unfinished hull was sold by Ukraine to what was apparently a Chinese travel agency for ostensible use as a floating hotel and casino. After an eventful journey under tow, she arrived in China in February 2002 and was berthed at the Dalian naval shipyard, where she was overhauled and completed as China's first aircraft carrier.

In September 2012, the ship was commissioned in the Chinese navy as Liaoning. The ship was named after the province where the shipyard is located, and its Chinese ship class is Type 001. Today, she serves as the first aircraft carrier of the PLAN, and its home port is Qingdao.

Shandong

The second Chinese aircraft carrier was constructed in China according to a modified design, known as Type 002. The ship was laid down in 2013 at the Dalian naval shipyard and was launched on 26 April 2017. Sea trials began on 13 May 2018, and the ship was commissioned as Shandong on 17 December 2019.

See also
 Shtorm-class supercarrier
 List of aircraft carriers
 List of aircraft carriers of Russia and the Soviet Union
 List of ships of the Soviet Navy
 List of ships of Russia by project number
 List of naval ship classes in service
 Chinese aircraft carrier programme
 Chinese aircraft carrier Fujian

References

External links

 
 
 

Aircraft cruiser classes
Kuznetsov class aircraft carrier
Kuznetsov class aircraft carrier
Ship classes of the Russian Navy